Francis Travers Dames-Longworth  (26 April 1834 – 3 December 1898) was an Anglo-Irish lawyer. 

Dames-Longworth was the son of Francis Longworth-Dames and Anna Hume. He was educated at Cheltenham College and Trinity College Dublin, and called to the Irish Bar in 1855. He inherited Glynwood House and its estate in 1881, and rebuilt the house with the assistance of architect George Moyers.

In 1872 Dames-Longworth was made a Queen's Counsel and he was elected Bencher of the King's Inns in 1876. He was a Commission of the Peace for six Irish counties. In 1882 he was appointed High Sheriff of Westmeath and he served as Lord Lieutenant of King's County between 1883 and 1892. He served a year as High Sheriff of County Galway in 1890. Dames-Longworth was then made Lord Lieutenant of Westmeath from 1892 until his death in 1898.

References

1834 births
1898 deaths
19th-century Anglo-Irish people
19th-century Irish lawyers
Alumni of King's Inns
Alumni of Trinity College Dublin
High Sheriffs of County Galway
High Sheriffs of County Westmeath
Irish justices of the peace
Lord-Lieutenants of King's County
Lord-Lieutenants of Westmeath
People educated at Cheltenham College
King's Counsel